Manipur Polo International 2014 or 8th Manipur International Polo Tournament was a polo tournament that was held in Imphal, Manipur, India. It was organised in Mapal Kangjeibung (Imphal Polo Ground), the oldest polo ground in the world. 

India had two teams: India-B (Manipur) and India-A (Indian Polo Association team). 

The India-B team (Manipur team) won the trophy after defeating South Africa by 7-5 goals. USA won the third place after being defeated by South Africa by 6-7 goals. India-B team (Manipur team) defeated India-A team (Indian Polo Association team) by 7-6 goals. 

In this year, Hada Samadon Ayangba is the theme song sung by Mangka Mayanglambam and presented by the Laihui Ensemble of Manipur.

Participants

References 

2014 in Indian sport
Polo in Manipur
Pages with unreviewed translations